Tamara Zidanšek (born 26 December 1997) is a Slovenian tennis player.
She has won one singles title and four doubles titles on the WTA Tour and two WTA Challenger singles titles, as well as 17 singles and four doubles titles on the ITF Circuit. On the ITF Junior Circuit, she was in top 20 and had a career-high ranking of No. 16, achieved in December 2015. Playing for the Slovenia Fed Cup team, she has a win–loss record of 9–8.

Professional career

2014: Professional debut
Zidanšek made a perfect professional debut in 2014 at her home in Velenje, passing three qualifying rounds to go in the main draw and claim her first title on the pro-level at the age of 16.

2021: First singles major semifinal, top-50 debut, first top-10 win & first WTA singles title
She reached the semifinals of a Grand Slam championship for the first time at the 2021 French Open, defeating Sorana Cîrstea in straight sets and Paula Badosa in three sets. These wins made her the first Slovenian female player to accomplish this since the country became independent in 1991. As a result, Zidanšek entered the top 50 for the first time. She also scored her first top-ten win in the first round, against the No. 6 seed, Bianca Andreescu. In the semifinal, Zidanšek was defeated by Anastasia Pavlyuchenkova, in straight sets.

At the Ladies Open Lausanne, as the top seed, Zidansek beat Marina Melnikova, Mandy Minella, Lucia Bronzetti, Maryna Zanevska and Clara Burel to win her first WTA Tour title.

2022
Seeded 29th at the Australian Open, she reached the third round for the first time, but lost to Alizé Cornet. At the French Open, Zidanšek was beaten in the third round by Jessica Pegula, in straight sets.

Coaching
Zidanšek was coached by Zoran Krajnc until April 2021. In May 2021, her team signed with Pancho Alvariño from Spain.
Carl Maes joined the team in December 2021 and was replaced by Alejandro Garcia Cenzano in January 2023.

Performance timelines

Only main-draw results in WTA Tour, Grand Slam tournaments, Fed Cup/Billie Jean King Cup and Olympic Games are included in win–loss records.

Singles
Current through the 2023 Thailand Open.

Doubles

WTA career finals

Singles: 3 (1 title, 2 runner-ups)

Doubles: 7 (4 titles, 3 runner-ups)

WTA Challenger finals

Singles: 2 (2 titles)

Doubles: 1 (runner-up)

ITF Circuit finals

Singles: 25 (17 titles, 8 runner–ups)

Doubles: 8 (4 titles, 4 runner–ups)

Fed Cup/Billie Jean King Cup participation

Singles: 12 (7–5)

Doubles: 5 (2–3)

WTA Tour career earnings
Current through the 2022 Australian Open

Head-to-head record

Record against top ten players
Zidanšek's record against players who have been ranked in the top 10. Active players are in boldface.

Top-10 wins

Notes

References

External links
 
  
 

1997 births
Living people
Slovenian female tennis players
People from Postojna
People from the Municipality of Slovenske Konjice